Top of the Tots is the 18th the Wiggles album. It was recorded in November 2003 and was released in 2004 by ABC Music distributed by Roadshow Entertainment. It was nominated for the 2004 ARIA Music Award for Best Children's Album but lost to Hi-5's Holiday.

Track list
 Bow Wow Wow (intro)
 Bow Wow Wow
 Central Park, New York (intro)
 Central Park, New York
 Cowboys and Cowgirls (intro)
 Cowboys and Cowgirls
 Fly Through the Sky (intro)
 Fly Through the Sky
 I Wave My Arms and Swing My Baton (intro)
 I Wave My Arms and Swing My Baton
 New York Firefighter (intro)
 New York Firefighter
 Picking Flowers (intro)
 Picking Flowers
 Say Aah at the Doctors (intro)
 Say Aah at the Doctors
 Feeling Chirpy (intro)
 Feeling Chirpy
 Lettuce Sing (Fresh Fruit and Veggies) (intro)
 Lettuce Sing (Fresh Fruit and Veggies)
 Let's Go Swimming (intro)
 Let's Go Swimming
 The Bricklayers Song (intro)
 The Bricklayers Song
 Tick Tock (All Night Long) (intro)
 Tick Tock (All Night Long)
 Can You Dig It? (intro)
 Can You Dig It?
 Knead Some Dough (intro)
 Knead Some Dough
 Open Wide, Look Inside at the Dentist (intro)
 Open Wide, Look Inside at the Dentist
 Hey There Partner (intro)
 Hey There Partner
 Walking on the Moon (intro)
 Walking on the Moon

Certifications

Video

Top of the Tots is the 17th The Wiggles video. It was released in 2004 by ABC Video.

Song list
 Bow Wow Wow
 Central Park, New York
 Cowboys and Cowgirls
 Fly Through the Sky
 I Wave My Arms and Swing My Baton
 New York Firefighter
 Picking Flowers
 Say Aah at the Doctors
 Feeling Chirpy
 Lettuce Sing (Fresh Fruit and Veggies)
 Let's Go Swimming
 The Bricklayers Song
 Calling All Cows
 Tick Tock (All Night Long)
 Can You Dig It?
 Knead Some Dough
 Open Wide, Look Inside at the Dentist

Release
 Australia: 10 March 2004

Cast
The cast as presented on the videos:

 The Wiggles are
 Murray Cook
 Jeff Fatt
 Anthony Field
 Greg Page

Additional Cast
 Captain Feathersword: Paul Paddick

References

External links

2003 albums
The Wiggles albums
The Wiggles videos
2004 video albums
Australian children's musical films